Wood Springs may refer to the following places in the United States:

 Wood Springs, Texas
 Wood Springs, Ganado, Arizona
Wood Springs 2 Fire, 2020

See also
 
 Woodspring, Somerset, England